Katherine M. Cohen (1859–1914) was an American sculptor.

Cohen was born in Philadelphia, Pennsylvania, on March 18, 1859, to Henry Cohen, originally from London, and Matilda (Samuel) Cohen, originally from Liverpool.

She received elite-level training in art, studying first at the Pennsylvania Academy of Fine Arts under painter Thomas Eakins, and later working at the Art Students League in New York City as an assistant in the studio of sculptor Augustus Saint-Gaudens. She opened her own studio in Philadelphia in 1884. Three years later, she began working for sculptors Denys Puech and Marius Jean Antonin Mercié in Paris, where she was elected an honorary member of the American Art Association.

Cohen exhibited a work, Bust of Harry Souther at the Columbian Exposition in Chicago, Illinois in 1893.

Cohen died in December 1914.

Notes

1859 births
1914 deaths
Pennsylvania Academy of the Fine Arts alumni
20th-century American sculptors
19th-century American sculptors
Artists from Philadelphia
19th-century American women artists
20th-century American women artists
Sculptors from Pennsylvania
Students of Thomas Eakins